Theodore Edgar McCarrick (born July 7, 1930) is a defrocked American bishop and former cardinal of the Catholic Church. Ordained a priest in 1958, he became an auxiliary bishop of the Archdiocese of New York in 1977, then became Bishop of Metuchen, New Jersey, in 1981. From 1986 to 2000, he was Archbishop of Newark. He was created a cardinal in February 2001 and served as Archbishop of Washington from 2001 to 2006. Following credible allegations of repeated sexual misconduct towards boys and seminarians, he was removed from public ministry in June 2018, became the first cardinal to resign from the College of Cardinals because of claims of sexual abuse in July 2018, and was laicized in February 2019. Several honors he had been awarded, such as honorary degrees, were rescinded.

A prolific fundraiser, he was connected to prominent politicians and was considered a power broker in Washington, D.C. Within the church, McCarrick was variously regarded as a moderate, or as a progressive, and was active in social justice causes.

McCarrick was accused of engaging in sexual misconduct with adult male seminarians over the course of decades. Though multiple reports about McCarrick's alleged conduct with adult seminarians were made to American bishops and the Vatican between 1993 and 2016, allegations of sexual abuse against minors were not known until 2018. In July 2018, The New York Times published a story detailing a pattern of sexual abuse of male seminarians and minors. After a church investigation and trial, he was found guilty of sexual crimes against adults and minors and abuse of power and dismissed from the clerical state in February 2019. He is the most senior church official in modern times to be laicized, and is the first known case of a cardinal being laicized for sexual abuse.

The apparent lack of action from the church hierarchy in this case sparked demands for action against church leaders believed to be responsible. On October 6, 2018, the Holy See announced that Pope Francis had ordered "a thorough study of the entire documentation present in the Archives of the Dicasteries and Offices of the Holy See regarding the former Cardinal McCarrick, in order to ascertain all the relevant facts, to place them in their historical context and to evaluate them objectively". The resulting report of the Secretariat of State, published in November 2020, stated that Pope John Paul II was made aware of allegations against McCarrick but did not believe them, and that Benedict XVI, in 2005, upon learning of newly surfaced allegations, urgently sought a successor for McCarrick. The report avoided blaming Pope Francis for the scandal.

Early life and education 
An only child, McCarrick was born into an Irish American family in New York City to Theodore E. and Margaret T. (née McLaughlin) McCarrick. His father was a ship captain who died from tuberculosis when McCarrick was three years old, and his mother then worked at an automobile parts factory in The Bronx. As a child, McCarrick served as an altar boy at the Church of the Incarnation in Washington Heights. He was expelled from the Jesuit Xavier High School in his junior year for missing classes.

McCarrick missed an academic year due to the expulsion, but a friend of his family was able to help get him into the Jesuit Fordham Preparatory School. At Fordham, he was elected student council president and served in the ROTC program for the United States Air Force. McCarrick studied in Switzerland for a year before returning to the United States and attending Fordham University.

McCarrick later entered St. Joseph's Seminary in Yonkers, from where he obtained a Bachelor of Arts in philosophy (1954) and a Master of Arts in theology (1958). McCarrick is a polyglot, speaking five languages (English, French, German, Italian and Spanish).

Priesthood 
McCarrick was ordained to the priesthood by Cardinal Francis Spellman, Archbishop of New York, on May 31, 1958. From 1958 to 1963, he furthered his studies at the Catholic University of America in Washington, D.C., earning a Ph.D. in sociology. He then served as an assistant chaplain at the Catholic University, becoming dean of students and director of development.

McCarrick served as president of the Catholic University of Puerto Rico from 1965 to 1969, and was given the honorary title of Domestic Prelate of His Holiness in 1965. In 1969, Cardinal Terence Cooke recalled McCarrick to New York. McCarrick was an associate secretary for education and an assistant priest at Blessed Sacrament parish from 1969 to 1971. He was Cooke's secretary from 1971 to 1977. He was later accused of sexually abusing a male minor during this period.

Episcopal career

Auxiliary bishop of New York 

In May 1977, McCarrick was appointed Auxiliary Bishop of New York and Titular Bishop of Rusibisir by Pope Paul VI. He received his episcopal consecration on the following June 29 from Cardinal Cooke, with Archbishop John Maguire and Bishop Patrick Ahern serving as co-consecrators. He selected as his episcopal motto: "Come Lord Jesus".

As an auxiliary to Cardinal Cooke, he served as vicar of East Manhattan and the Harlems.

Bishop of Metuchen 
On November 19, 1981, McCarrick was appointed the first Bishop of the Diocese of Metuchen, New Jersey. He was installed at St. Francis of Assisi Cathedral on January 31, 1982. During his tenure, McCarrick erected new parishes in Perth Amboy, Califon, Skillman, Old Bridge, and Three Bridges. He also oversaw the development of the Diocesan Council of Catholic Women, Bishop's Annual Appeal, and ministries for blacks and Hispanics, anti-abortion activities, and the disabled.

In 2001 a Catholic high school, originally established in 1885 and renamed multiple times through the years, was named Cardinal McCarrick High School in honor of McCarrick as the first bishop of the diocese. The school closed in June 2015 for financial reasons.

Archbishop of Newark 
On May 30, 1986, McCarrick was appointed the fourth Archbishop of Newark. He succeeded Peter Leo Gerety, and was installed at the Cathedral of the Sacred Heart on the following July 25. During his tenure, he established the Office of Evangelization, ministries for Hispanics and victims of HIV, and a drug prevention program. He also promoted vocations, and ordained a total of 200 priests for the archdiocese.

McCarrick became known as an advocate for social justice, once saying, "[T]he Church cannot be authentic unless it takes care of the poor, the newcomers, the needy." During the 1980s, he served as an official observer to the Helsinki Commission and the Conference on Security and Co-operation in Europe at the behest of the State Department. In 1988, he participated in an interfaith meeting with Fidel Castro to promote religious freedom in Cuba, the first meeting of its kind subsequent to the fall of Fulgencio Batista. McCarrick, as a representative of Irish immigrant families, was chosen to be placed in the Ellis Island Hall of Fame on December 8, 1990.

Within the United States Conference of Catholic Bishops (USCCB), he served as chairman of the Committee on Aid to the Church in Central and Eastern Europe from 1992 to 1997. In this capacity, he visited such countries as Serbia and Montenegro, the Baltics, and Kazakhstan. He was twice elected to head the USCCB's Committee on Migration, and once asked the Congress "to recognize and support the important task of nurturing new citizens so that they may begin to play a full role in the future of this nation." He later became a member of the Pontifical Council for the Pastoral Care of Migrants and Itinerants.

He was elected chairman of the Bishops' Committee on International Policy in 1996. He visited Bosnia (which he described as "reminiscent of the Holocaust"), China, Poland, Romania, Russia, Rwanda, and Switzerland. Joined by Secretary of Labor Alexis Herman, he announced an initiative in 1997 to assure that Catholic school uniforms in his archdiocese would not be manufactured in sweatshops.

In 1998, in addition to his duties as archbishop, McCarrick was designated as superior of the Roman Catholic Mission sui iuris of the Turks and Caicos Islands; he delegated this mission to priests of the Neocatechumenal Way.

Archbishop of Washington 

Pope John Paul II appointed McCarrick Archbishop of Washington, D.C. in November 2000. McCarrick was formally installed as the fifth archbishop of Washington at the Cathedral of St. Matthew the Apostle on January 3, 2001. On February 21, 2001, John Paul made him a cardinal, assigning him as cardinal priest to the titular church of Santi Nereo e Achilleo. He was one of the cardinal electors who participated in the 2005 papal conclave that elected Pope Benedict XVI.

In June 2004, McCarrick was accused of intentionally misreading a letter from Cardinal Joseph Ratzinger recommending that Catholic politicians who supported abortion rights be denied the Eucharist. McCarrick led a successful push to have the USCCB allow the bishops of individual dioceses to determine who was or was not eligible to receive the sacrament of communion. Fr. Richard John Neuhaus said, "The bishops I have talked to have no doubt that [McCarrick's] presentation did not accurately represent the communication from Cardinal Ratzinger." McCarrick said that he did not want to cause "a confrontation with the Sacred Body of the Lord Jesus in my hand," and added that "the individual should be the one who decides whether or not he is in communion with the Church" and therefore eligible to receive the sacrament. McCarrick later met with then senator John Kerry, a Catholic and the Democratic nominee in that year's presidential election. Some Catholics felt Kerry should not have been allowed to receive Communion due to his political position favoring abortion rights.

Although McCarrick was sometimes labelled a liberal, he was noted for adhering to church teaching on abortion, same-sex marriage, and the male-only priesthood. American Catholic journalist Michael Sean Winters disputed this claim writing "Liberals embraced him as a champion of moderation at a time when the Church was seen as increasingly reactionary. I always thought he was playing to the cameras."

Retirement as archbishop 

On May 16, 2006, Pope Benedict XVI accepted McCarrick's resignation as Archbishop of Washington, after the latter's reaching the customary age limit of 75, and appointed Donald Wuerl, Bishop of Pittsburgh, as the 6th Archbishop of Washington, DC. From May 16, 2006, until Wuerl's installation on June 22, 2006, McCarrick served as the Apostolic Administrator of the Archdiocese of Washington, an interim post.

After his retirement, McCarrick resided for some time at the Redemptoris Mater seminary in the Archdiocese of Washington. He subsequently moved to the grounds of the provincial headquarters of the Institute of the Incarnate Word in Chillum, Maryland, in a building on a complex that included a seminary.

McCarrick was named a counselor at the Center for Strategic and International Studies in 2007.

In 2009, McCarrick presided over the graveside service of U.S. Senator Edward M. Kennedy at Arlington National Cemetery, where he read from a letter Kennedy had written to Pope Benedict XVI. In 2015, he served as one of the concelebrants at the funeral of Delaware Attorney General Beau Biden, son of President Joe Biden, (then Vice President) and presided over the closing Mass as well.

Within the church, McCarrick "was always seen as a moderate, centrist presence in the hierarchy, a telegenic pastor who could present the welcoming face of the Church, no matter what the circumstances". A news article identified him in 2014 as "one of a number of senior churchmen who were more or less put out to pasture during the eight-year pontificate of Benedict XVI", adding that after the election of Pope Francis he found himself put "back in the mix." He was described as a "pope maker" by David Gibson, longtime religion reporter and author of "The Coming Catholic Church".

During his retirement, McCarrick pressed House Speaker John Boehner to take up immigration reform. McCarrick spent a significant amount of time traveling and engaging in inter-religious dialogue. In April 2014, at the request of the U.S. State Department, McCarrick (along with a Muslim and an Evangelical cleric) made a trip to the Central African Republic, a country suffering from ethnic and interreligious violence. In May 2014, he traveled with Pope Francis to the Holy Land. McCarrick traveled to Armenia to discuss Syria with Eastern Orthodox clerics, the Philippines to visit typhoon victims, China for discussions on religious freedom, Iran for talks on nuclear proliferation, and served as a Vatican intermediary for the U.S.-Cuba talks.

The release of some of McCarrick's correspondences' in May 2019 indicates that he attempted to influence the selection of a United States ambassador to the Holy See. On 27 January 2017, in response to rumors President Trump was planning to appoint Catholic commentator George Weigel, McCarrick wrote to Pope Francis stating that Weigel was "very much a leader of the ultra-conservative wing of the Catholic Church in the United States and has been publicly critical of Your Holiness in the past." He added, "Many of us American bishops would have great concerns about his being named to such a position in which he would have an official voice, in opposition to your teaching." McCarrick indicated interest in discussing the topic further with the Pope, but there are no indications in their correspondence of whether he did so.

Sexual abuse and abuse of authority

Warnings of alleged misconduct 
In 1994, a priest wrote a letter to Bishop Edward T. Hughes, McCarrick's successor as Bishop of Metuchen, stating that McCarrick had inappropriately touched him. 

Also in 1994, Cardinal Agostino Cacciavillan, then papal nuncio to the United States, received a phone call from a woman who was concerned that there would be a media scandal if Pope John Paul II went to Newark during his 1995 visit to the United States because of "voices (rumors) about McCarrick's behavior with seminarians." Cacciavillan then told Cardinal John O'Connor, Archbishop of New York, about the woman's call. O'Connor conducted an "investigation, an inquiry" and eventually told Cacciavillan that "there was no obstacle to the visit of the Pope to Newark." Cacciavillan stated that he did not inform the Vatican. According to Italian journalists Andrea Tornielli and Gianni Valente, Cardinal O'Connor, in fact "objected strongly to John Paul II's idea of rewarding McCarrick and the diocese of Newark with a stop during his papal visit to the United States in 1995", but that John Paul's personal secretary, Msgr. Stanisław Dziwisz, was able to intercept these objections before they reached the pope. The authors suggest that this was because as bishop, McCarrick was an efficient fundraiser for the Pope's causes, including anti-Communist efforts in Poland.

Father Boniface Ramsey stated that he spoke to Thomas C. Kelly, Archbishop of Louisville, about McCarrick in 1993. In 2000, Ramsey wrote to the nuncio, Gabriel Montalvo Higuera, to complain about McCarrick's behavior. The letter was forwarded to Leonardo Sandri, the Vatican substitute for general affairs and later, a cardinal. Ramsey said that he tried to speak with Cardinal Edward Egan, then Archbishop of New York, about McCarrick's history, but that Egan "didn't want to hear it". In February 2019, the same month McCarrick was laicized by the Vatican, an image of a letter dated October 11, 2006 which Sandri sent to Ramsey, and which illustrates Ramsey's account of his involvement in the McCarrick affair, was published by the media, including in a Commonweal article which Ramsey himself wrote. The image showed that McCarrick's name and Archbishop status were concealed in the letter whenever Sandri mentioned it. 

In 2015, Ramsey wrote to Cardinal Seán Patrick O'Malley, Archbishop of Boston, about McCarrick. O'Malley stated that he never saw the letter, and that it had been handled "at the staff level."

Richard Sipe stated that he wrote a letter to Benedict XVI in 2008, saying that McCarrick's activities "had been widely known for several decades." Sipe sent a letter to Bishop Robert W. McElroy in 2016, concerning sexual misconduct by McCarrick. McElroy asked if Sipe would be willing to share corroborating material that would substantiate his allegations. Sipe said that he was precluded from sharing specific documentary information. McElroy said "[T]he limitations on his willingness to share corroborating information made it impossible to know what was real and what was rumor."

Mike Kelly of the New Jersey Record reported that in a conversation with Cardinal Joseph W. Tobin of Newark, Tobin said that around the time he became Archbishop of Newark in 2016, he heard "rumors" about McCarrick having slept with seminarians, but chose not to believe them, stating that at the time they seemed too "incredulous" to be true. Kelly also mentioned that in 1998, based on a tip, he himself had attempted to investigate the rumors, "but no seminarians would talk".

Settlements
Between 2005 and 2007, the Diocese of Metuchen and the Archdiocese of Newark paid financial settlements to two priests who had accused McCarrick of abuse. These settlements totalled $180,000.

In 2005, the Archdiocese of Newark and the Dioceses of Trenton and Metuchen paid a total of $80,000 to a former priest, who stated that McCarrick would touch him in bed, but only above the waist, and that they never kissed. The Diocese of Metuchen's contribution was not in reference to McCarrick, but to an allegation regarding previous conduct of a teacher at a high school located at that time in the diocese.

In 2006, $100,000 was paid by the Diocese (where McCarrick had been bishop from 1981 to 1986). The payments were authorized by Metuchen bishop Paul G. Bootkoski, who also reported the offenses to law enforcement. According to Donald Cardinal Wuerl, McCarrick's successor as Archbishop of Washington, nobody from these dioceses informed him of these settlements, even after the retired McCarrick began living on the grounds of a seminary in the Archdiocese of Washington. In 2010, Sipe published excerpts from the 2005 and 2007 settlement documents.

Between 2001 and 2006, McCarrick gave $600,000 to high-ranking church officials, including two popes, multiple priests, cardinals and archbishops, when he was Archbishop of Washington. According to The Washington Post, "Several of the more than 100 recipients were directly involved in assessing misconduct claims against McCarrick". Some of those recipients, however, including both Pope John Paul II and Pope Benedict XVI, had little oversight over these transactions. 

In February 2020, America magazine revealed that the Diocese of Metuchen, the Archdiocese of Newark, and Diocese of Trenton had, beginning in 2005, worked together to secretly pay victims of McCarrick. Former substitute for general affairs at the Secretariat of State, Leonardo Sandri, who received the letter of concern from Ramsey in 2000, was suspected of participating in the cover-up of McCarrick's acts, and America journalist Thomas J. Reese recommended that he and others be interviewed as part of the Vatican's investigation into the former cardinal.

Abuse of seminarians 
In 2018, multiple media outlets reported a number of priests and former seminarians under McCarrick had come forward alleging that McCarrick had engaged in inappropriate conduct with seminarians. These included reports that he made sexual advances toward seminarians during his tenure as Bishop of Metuchen and Archbishop of Newark. McCarrick reportedly routinely invited a number of seminarians to a house on the shore with limited sleeping accommodations, resulting in one of them sharing a bed with the bishop. According to former seminarian Desmond Rossi, he and a friend later realized that the archbishop would cancel weekend gatherings "if there were not enough men going that they would exceed the number of available beds, thus necessitating one guest to share a bed with the archbishop". Rossi subsequently transferred before ordination from the Archdiocese of Newark to a diocese in New York State.

Wuerl denied having any prior knowledge of claims regarding sexual abuse on the part of McCarrick. On January 10, 2019, The Washington Post published a story stating that Wuerl was aware of allegations against McCarrick in 2004 and reported them to the Vatican. In a January 12, 2019 letter, Wuerl stated that when "the allegation of sexual abuse of a minor was brought against Archbishop McCarrick, I stated publicly that I was never aware of any such allegation or rumors." But the context, he said, was in discussions about sexual abuse of minors, not adults. He later said in a letter dated January 15 to the priests of the archdiocese that the survivor in the previous Pittsburgh case had asked that the matter be kept confidential, and he heard no more about it: "I did not avert to it again," and "only afterwards was I reminded of the 14-year-old accusation of inappropriate conduct which, by that time, I had forgotten."	

In August 2019, letters and postcards that McCarrick sent to his alleged victims were made public. Two abuse prevention experts who reviewed the letters and postcards for the Associated Press described the correspondence as "a window into the way a predator grooms his prey."

Removal from ministry and resignation as cardinal 
In 2013, Scottish cardinal Keith O'Brien, who was accused of sexual misconduct in the 1980s, resigned as Archbishop of Saint Andrews and Edinburgh, and left Scotland in disgrace for "months of "prayer and penance", although not defrocked or stripped of his cardinalate. He was the first sexually predatory Catholic cardinal whose case was dealt with publicly. The O'Brien case forced accountability and discussion of such cases on the Catholic Church, and Rome was forced to create a process. In a telephone interview about O'Brien at the time, Richard Sipe said that O'Brien was not the only case: "We have someone here too. It will go public soon." He was referring to McCarrick.

In 2021, Brian Devlin, one of O'Brien's victims who later left the priesthood, waived anonymity to publish a book, Cardinal Sin, about his experiences and his fight for improved church governance and accountability. 

According to Devlin, O'Brien's and McCarrick's cases were linked: "If we hadn't gone to the Observer [UK newspaper] back then, the church would have dealt with McCarrick quite differently. Without O'Brien, there would be no church process."

On June 20, 2018, McCarrick was removed from public ministry by the Holy See, after a review board of the Roman Catholic Archdiocese of New York found an allegation "credible and substantiated" that he had sexually abused a 16-year-old altar boy while a priest in New York. Patrick Noaker, the attorney for the anonymous complainant, alleged two incidents at St. Patrick's Cathedral, one in 1971 and the other in 1972. Noaker stated that when measuring the teen for a cassock, McCarrick "unzipped [the boy's] pants and put his hands in the boy's pants." McCarrick stated that he was innocent of these charges: "I have absolutely no recollection of this reported abuse, and believe in my innocence." He also stated, "In obedience I accept the decision of The Holy See, that I no longer exercise any public ministry." Also on June 20, 2018, Cardinal Tobin revealed that during McCarrick's ministry in New Jersey, there had been accusations of sexual misconduct with three adults, and that two of the allegations had resulted in confidential financial settlements with the complainants.

On July 5, 2018, Fordham University rescinded an honorary degree and other honors it had granted McCarrick. The Catholic University of America, where McCarrick earned two degrees and served in a variety of spiritual and administrative positions, also revoked the honorary degree it had awarded him in 2006. On July 16, 2018, The New York Times published a front-page article describing McCarrick's abuse of adult seminarians. On July 19, The New York Times published an article based on the story of a man named James, whose last name was withheld. A New Jersey man whose uncle had known McCarrick since high school, James alleged that McCarrick had sexually abused him beginning at age 11. James had been the first boy McCarrick had ever baptized. James said that McCarrick had exposed himself to him when he was 11 and had sexually touched him beginning when he was 13. He explained that he tried to tell his father a couple of years later but was not believed. On November 13, James revealed himself as James Grein, and gave a public speech at the "Silence Stops Now Rally" in Baltimore, where he called on Catholics to "reform and reclaim the Church." Speaking about alleged mishandling of allegations by Catholic bishops, he said, "Our bishops must know that the jig is up."

On July 27, 2018, Pope Francis ordered McCarrick to observe "a life of prayer and penance in seclusion" and accepted his resignation from the College of Cardinals, the first resignation since Louis Billot, a French prelate, resigned in 1927 when he refused an order to withdraw his support of Action Française, a monarchist movement that Pope Pius XI had condemned. He is also the first cardinal to resign following allegations of sexual abuse. The Pope took this action before the accusations were investigated by church officials, the first time an order of penance and prayer has been issued before a church trial. McCarrick was not laicized (removed from the priesthood) at the time, pending the completion of a canonical trial. The Holy See announced on July 28, 2018, that Pope Francis had ordered Archbishop McCarrick (as he then became known) to obey an "obligation to remain in a house yet to be indicated to him" and also observe "a life of prayer and penance until the accusations made against him are examined in a regular canonical trial."

In December 2019, McCarrick was sued by a man named John Bellocchio, who said that McCarrick sexually abused him when he was a 14-year-old boy in the 1990s.

Viganò allegations 

On August 25, 2018, Archbishop Carlo Maria Viganò, former Apostolic Nuncio to the United States, released an 11-page letter describing a series of warnings to the Vatican regarding McCarrick. Viganò stated that Montalvo, then nuncio to the United States, had informed the Vatican in 2000 of what Viganò characterized as McCarrick's "gravely immoral behaviour with seminarians and priests." He further stated that Archbishop Pietro Sambi,  the nuncio from 2005 to 2011, had also informed the Vatican. Viganò says that in 2006 – when working at the Vatican – he wrote his own memo regarding McCarrick. However, he says, nothing was done to stop McCarrick. In 2008, Viganò says he wrote a second memo, including material from Sipe.

In 2009 or 2010, according to Viganò, Pope Benedict XVI placed severe restrictions on McCarrick's movements and public ministry, not allowing him to travel beyond the grounds of the seminary where he was living and not permitting him to say Mass in public. However, according to Viganò, Pope Francis subsequently removed these sanctions and made McCarrick "his trusted counselor", even though Francis "knew from at least June 23, 2013 that McCarrick was a serial predator. He knew that he was a corrupt man, he covered for him to the bitter end."

However, Italian journalists Tornielli and Valente report that "it was in 2007 – not 2009, as Viganò has said – that Pope Benedict XVI issued his 'instructions' to McCarrick." McCarrick responded in a 2008 letter to Vatican Secretary of State, Tarcisio Bertone, writing that he had shared his bed with seminarians. He said that "this was never done in secret or behind closed doors," and that he had never "had sexual relations with anyone, man, woman or child, nor have I ever sought such acts." Having given his explanation, the Archbishop then proceeded to largely ignore the Pope's instructions.

Viganò called on Pope Francis and all others who he said covered up McCarrick's conduct to resign. It was observed that during the time McCarrick was allegedly under sanction, he maintained a "robust public presence" full of international travel, public masses, speeches, and the acceptance of awards, although in July 2010, on the occasion of his eightieth birthday, he declined an interview with The Washington Post. The reporter said that the Cardinal seemed to be avoiding the media. Both Cardinal Marc Ouellet, having been asked to come forward in 2018 by Viganò, and the "2020 Vatican Report on McCarrick" largely confirmed Viganò's statements that the Vatican under Benedict XVI imposed restrictions on McCarrick, although McCarrick proved often unwilling to follow them. The report also found that Viganò actively sought harsh sanctions for McCarrick while working as an official in the Secretariat of State. However, both Oullet and the report disputed Viganò's accusations against Francis, with the report admitting only that Francis heard of rumors about sexual impropriety by McCarrick but believed them to be discredited, and did not hear reports about abuse of minors until 2018.

Viganò stated that he discussed McCarrick's conduct and the penalties surrounding it with McCarrick's successor as Archbishop of Washington, Cardinal Wuerl, who he says transgressed the Pope's order by allowing McCarrick to continue living at the seminary and therefore putting other seminarians at risk. Wuerl, through his spokesperson, Ed McFadden, denied that he was aware of any restrictions on McCarrick. "Archbishop Viganò presumed that Wuerl had specific information that Wuerl did not have," McFadden said. McCarrick's situation reportedly became easier when Nuncio Pietro Sambi died unexpectedly in July 2011 and was succeeded by Viganò, who, according to Tornielli and Valente, proved less eager to enforce Benedict XVI's instructions to McCarrick. Viganò subsequently acknowledged that Pope Benedict had made the restrictions private, perhaps "due to the fact that he (Archbishop McCarrick) was already retired, maybe due to the fact that he (Pope Benedict) was thinking he was ready to obey."

The McCarrick case, along with the conclusion of the Grand jury investigation of Catholic Church sexual abuse in Pennsylvania, which alleged systematic cover-up of clergy sex abuse by bishops in Pennsylvania over decades, triggered a general call from Catholics across ideological boundaries for greater accountability and transparency in the church. However, these issues, in particular the Viganò allegations, have also escalated tensions in the Catholic Church between ideological liberals and conservatives, especially over the possible role of homosexuality in clergy sex abuse and the alleged complicity of Pope Francis in protecting McCarrick.

On May 28, 2019, McCarrick's private secretary, Msgr. Anthony J. Figueiredo, released letters written by McCarrick suggesting that while senior Vatican officials placed restrictions on the former Cardinal after abuse allegations surfaced, they were not official sanctions and were not strictly enforced under the papacies of either Pope Benedict XVI or Pope Francis. In an interview published on May 28, 2019, Francis directly addressed the accusations made in Viganò's letter for the first time. He stated that he "knew nothing" about McCarrick's conduct. McCarrick claimed to have discussed restrictions that were placed on him with Wuerl, but Wuerl denied that he had any knowledge of such restrictions.

Vatican trial and laicization 
On September 28, 2018, it was announced that McCarrick had moved to the Capuchin St. Fidelis Friary in Victoria, Kansas, the day before. The announcement was unpopular with many of the citizens of Victoria, especially because the friary is near an elementary school. Before McCarrick was laicized, the Archdiocese of Washington was paying a little over $500 a month for his lodging. After he was laicized, the archdiocese stopped the payments, and the friary stated that it would not be receiving remuneration from McCarrick or the local Roman Catholic Diocese of Salina for McCarrick's stay, even though McCarrick offered to pay.

On February 16, 2019, the Holy See Press Office announced that McCarrick had been laicized. The Congregation for the Doctrine of the Faith (CDF), in a church penal process, found McCarrick guilty of "solicitation in the Sacrament of Confession, and sins against the Sixth Commandment with minors and with adults, with the aggravating factor of the abuse of power". The guilty verdict was issued by the CDF on January 11, 2019, and McCarrick appealed. The CDF rejected the appeal on February 13 and McCarrick was notified on February 15. Pope Francis "recognized the definitive nature of this decision made in accord with law, rendering it a res iudicata (i.e., admitting of no further recourse)", meaning it is final and McCarrick has no further opportunity to appeal. The CDF used an expedited administrative process designed for cases in which evidence is overwhelming. McCarrick's ordination as a priest and ordination as a bishop cannot be undone according to sacramental theology, but McCarrick cannot licitly (lawfully) perform any priestly duties, including celebrating Mass, although he may administer the sacrament of Penance to a penitent in danger of death; McCarrick can be stripped of the right to financial support from the church; and his laicization is permanent. McCarrick is the most senior church official in modern times to be laicized.

In an interview with Slate published in September 2019, McCarrick stated, "I'm not as bad as they paint me. ... I do not believe that I did the things that they accused me of." McCarrick stated he believed the persons making accusations against him were "encouraged to do that" by his "enemies", and said repeatedly that many young men had come to the beach house without having any problems. McCarrick revealed that he never left the friary and participated in the daily routine of the other men who lived there. In January 2020, it was announced that McCarrick had moved out of the friary to an undisclosed location that was "secluded and away from public attention". McCarrick reportedly made the decision to move over concerns that media attention regarding his presence there might have a negative impact on the friary and because he wanted to be closer to his family.

Title IX 
On September 5, 2019, it was revealed that an investigation conducted by Seton Hall University found that McCarrick's acts of sexual abuse against seminarians at the University were classified as a Title IX offense. Incidents of sex abuse McCarrick committed at both Immaculate Conception Seminary and St. Andrew's Seminary were not reported to the university because at the time, they were not compliant with Title IX. The report, which was reviewed by the law firm of Latham & Watkins, also accused McCarrick of creating a "culture of fear and intimidation" at Seton Hall University when he led the University as Archbishop of Newark. On August 10, 2020, however, it was revealed that a seminary professor did report in the late 1980s that McCarrick was taking seminary students to his shore house and that this allegation was disregarded by the Catholic Church.

Lawsuits 
In August 2019, one of McCarrick's alleged victims, James Grein, filed a lawsuit against McCarrick and the Archdiocese of New York. In December 2019, Grein extended his lawsuit to the New Jersey-based Archdiocese of Newark and Diocese of Metuchen, claiming that the two dioceses committed gross negligence when they allowed McCarrick, who Grein stated was a friend of his family, to continue to visit and sexually abuse him. That same month, a new law went into effect throughout New Jersey which allowed more sex victims to file lawsuits. This resulted in more of McCarrick's alleged New Jersey victims filing lawsuits against McCarrick and the two Dioceses he served in that state. One of these cases was also reported to be the first sex abuse lawsuit brought against the Holy See, which was accused of receiving reports of sex abuse committed by McCarrick in 1988 and 1995.

A lawsuit was filed on July 21, 2020, by an anonymous person saying that McCarrick operated a sex ring out of his New Jersey beachouse. The alleged victim maintained that McCarrick abused him with the assistance of other priests beginning in 1982, when he was 14. The lawsuit stated that boys were assigned different rooms in the house and paired with adult clergymen. The alleged victim, who attended schools operated by the Archdiocese of Newark, alleged priests and others under the control of McCarrick engaged in "open and obvious criminal sexual conduct" that was kept cloaked by the church and also served as "procurers" for McCarrick. The Archidocese of Newark, Diocese of Metuchen, where McCarrick was serving as Bishop of at time of the alleged abuse, and the Catholic schools the alleged victim attended where named as defendants in the lawsuit as well. On September 9, 2020, a new lawsuit was filed which alleged that McCarrick kept a second beach house which he also used as a sex ring when he was Bishop of Metuchen. It was also revealed that the Archdiocese of Newark had purchased one of McCarrick's Diocese of Metuchen beach houses in 1997, when he was serving as Archbishop, just four months before selling the other beach house, which it also purchased from the Diocese of Metuchen, as well.

In November 2021, a new lawsuit was filed against both McCarrick and the Archdiocese of Newark by Michael Reading, an ordained priest who claimed McCarrick sexually abused him during a visit to the New Jersey shore in 1986. The alleged abuse occurred around the same time McCarrick ordained Reading as a priest.

Vatican report
On November 10, 2020, the Vatican released a report about the handling of allegations against McCarrick. It states that through an October 1999 letter from Cardinal O'Connor, Pope John Paul II learned of allegations of sexual deviancy against McCarrick while in the process of considering him for the position of Archbishop of Washington, but that an investigation was paused after three of the four bishops tasked with looking into the accusations provided "inaccurate and incomplete information." John Paul II then decided not to appoint him, but changed his mind after receiving a letter from McCarrick proclaiming his innocence. The report suggested that John Paul II was probably influenced by his experience in his native Poland where the communist government used "spurious allegations against bishops to degrade the standing of the Church". The report states that Benedict XVI asked for McCarrick's resignation as Archbishop of Washington in 2005, after learning about the 1994 letter to Hughes. The Vatican Office for Bishops ordered McCarrick to retire to private life verbally in 2006, and put it in writing in 2008, but both times he ignored their instructions. However, Benedict was also faulted in the report for not standing in the way of McCarrick's growing power. According to the report, Pope Francis, prior to becoming pope, had learned of allegations against McCarrick before McCarrick was named Archbishop of Washington, but believed that John Paul II had rejected them. Francis knew of rumors surrounding sexual conduct between McCarrick and adults but received no documentation of sexual impropriety against McCarrick until 2017, and was not aware of accusations of sexual abuse against minors until 2018.

Holy See federal lawsuit
On November 19, 2020, four people who accused McCarrick of sexually abusing them filed a lawsuit against the Holy See in federal court in Newark, New Jersey, saying it had failed in its oversight of McCarrick over whom it exercised complete control as his employer. The Holy See says priests are not its employees and that its status as a foreign sovereign is a defense from such a suit.

Criminal charges 
On July 29, 2021, McCarrick was charged with sexually assaulting a 16-year-old male in 1974, during a wedding reception for the boy's brother on the grounds of Wellesley College in Massachusetts. The complaint was filed by Wellesley Police in Dedham Criminal Court. McCarrick's attorney, Barry Coburn, was quoted in media reports as saying, "we will look forward to addressing this issue in the courtroom."

On September 3, 2021, McCarrick pleaded not guilty in Dedham Criminal Court to three counts of indecent assault and battery stemming from the alleged 1974 incident. In an early 2023 court filing, McCarrick's lawyers stated that he is unable to stand trial based upon a recent neurological examination.

Honorary degrees 
McCarrick was awarded at least 35 honorary degrees, many of which have now been revoked or are currently under consideration for revocation.  Please be aware that it is possible that universities rescinded the honorary degrees and it may not be noted on this list.

See also 
 Hans Hermann Groër

References

External links 

 
 Biography from the Washington Archdiocese website.
 Retiring Archbishop Gives Farewell Homily Washington Post, June 19, 2006, by Candace Rondeaux.
 Catholic Hierarchy

1930 births
20th-century American criminals
21st-century American cardinals
Roman Catholic archbishops of Washington
American Roman Catholic clergy of Irish descent
Roman Catholic archbishops of Newark
Clergy from New York City
Criminals from New York City
20th-century Roman Catholic archbishops in the United Kingdom
Living people
Fordham Preparatory School alumni
Catholic University of America alumni
Cardinals created by Pope John Paul II
People stripped of honorary degrees
Catholic Church sexual abuse scandals in the United States
Resigned cardinals
Laicized Roman Catholic bishops
Members of the Inter-American Dialogue
Catholic bishops convicted of sexual abuse